2007 in Ghana details events of note that happened in Ghana in that year.

Incumbents
 President: John Kufuor
 Vice President: Aliu Mahama
 Chief Justice: George Kingsley Acquah (until 25 March), Georgina Theodora Wood (starting 25 March)

Events

January
29th - President John Kufuor becomes chairman of the African Union.

March

6 March - Celebrations mark 50 years of Ghana's independence from the United Kingdom. A military parade took place on Black Star Square in Accara.

June
6 June - Ghana discovers oil in commercial quantities.

July
1 July - The Bank of Ghana starts circulating the new currency the Ghana cedi.

December
22 December - President Kufuor declares Ghana's oil reserves total .

National holidays
Holidays in italics are "special days", while those in regular type are "regular holidays".
 January 1: New Year's Day
 March 6: Independence Day
 May 1: Labor Day
 December 25: Christmas
 December 26: Boxing Day

In addition, several other places observe local holidays, such as the foundation of their town. These are also "special days."

References